Asociación de Baloncesto Pacense, also known as ABP, is a basketball team based in Badajoz, Extremadura, Spain, who currently plays in Liga EBA.

History
AB Pacense was founded in 2005 with the aim to substitute dissolved basketball teams of Badajoz like CajaBadajoz, Círculo Badajoz (former LEB Oro team) or Habitacle. The team started playing on 1ª División (Spanish fifth division).

In 2008 promotes to Liga EBA, division where it continues playing nowadays. In 2011 the team plays the promotion playoffs to LEB Plata but after eliminating the farm team of Real Madrid, is defeated by CB Santfeliuenc in a disastrous second leg game.

In summer 2011 the club tried to achieve a vacant berth of LEB Plata, but finally continues playing in Liga EBA.

Finally, the club was dissolved in summer 2013.

Season by season

References

External links
Official website

Defunct basketball teams in Spain
Basketball teams in Extremadura
Former Liga EBA teams
Basketball teams disestablished in 2013
Basketball teams established in 2005
Sport in Badajoz